John H. Hall may refer to:

 John H. Hall (gunsmith) (1781–1841), inventor who perfected the American system of manufacturing using interchangeable parts
 John H. Hall (inventor) (1932–2014), American low-power CMOS pioneer and entrepreneur
 John Herbert Hall, English First World War flying ace
 John Hicklin Hall (1854–1937), politician and attorney in Oregon
 John Hubert Hall (1899–1970), governor of Oregon

See also
 John Hall (disambiguation)